Ülejõe (Estonian for "Across the River") refers to several places in Estonia:

Ülejõe, Pärnu, neighborhood of Pärnu
Ülejõe, Tartu, neighborhood of Tartu
Ülejõe, Harju County
Ülejõe, Anija Parish, village in Anija Parish
Ülejõe, Rae Parish, village in Rae Parish
Ülejõe, Järva County
Ülejõe, Koigi Parish, village in Koigi Parish
Ülejõe, Väätsa Parish, village in Väätsa Parish
Ülejõe, Rapla County
Ülejõe, Märjamaa Parish, village in Märjamaa Parish
Ülejõe, Rapla Parish, village in Rapla Parish